Cook is an occupational surname of English origin. Notable people with the surname include:

A 
Aaron Cook (disambiguation), multiple people
Adam Cook (disambiguation), multiple people
A. J. Cook (born 1978), Canadian actress
A. J. Cook (trade unionist) (1883–1931), Welsh trade unionist
Alan Cook (disambiguation) or Allan, multiple people
Alana Cook (born 1997), American soccer player
Alastair Cook (born 1984), English cricketer
Albert Cook (disambiguation), multiple people
Alex Cook (disambiguation), multiple people
Alfred M. Cook, American politician
Ali Cook, English magician and actor
Alice Cook (disambiguation), multiple people
Alistair Cook (disambiguation), multiple people
Allison Cook (disambiguation), multiple people
Alyssa-Jane Cook (born 1967), Australian actress, singer and television presenter
Amanda Cook (singer) (born 1984), Canadian singer
Amy Cook (born 1979), American musician and singer-songwriter
Anne Cook (disambiguation), or Ann, multiple people
Annelies Cook (born 1984), American biathlete
Anthony Cook (disambiguation), multiple people
Arthur Cook (disambiguation) multiple people
Austin Cook (born 1991), American golfer

B 
Barbara Cook (1927–2017), American singer and actress
Barrie Cook (1929–2020), English artist
Barry Cook, American film director
Beano Cook (1931–2012), American sportscaster
Bekki Cook (born 1950), American politician
Benjamin Cook (disambiguation), multiple people
Bert Cook (disambiguation), multiple people
Beryl Cook (1926–2008), English painter
Betsy Cook, American musician
 Bill Cook or Billy Cook see William Cook (disambiguation)
Blaine Cook, American singer
Bob Cook (1948–1978), Canadian ice hockey player
Bobby Lee Cook (1925–2021), American lawyer
Boo Cook (born 1972), British comic artist
Brendon Cook (born 1979), Australian racing driver
Brian Cook (disambiguation), multiple people
Bruce Cook (1932–2003), American writer
Bun Cook, Canadian professional ice hockey forward
Byron Cook (disambiguation), several people

C 
Carole Cook (1924–2023), American actress
Catherine Cook (disambiguation), multiple people
Charlie Cook (born 1953), American political analyst
Chris Cook (disambiguation), multiple people
Christine Cook (born 1970), English field hockey player
Clara Cook (1921–1996), American baseball player
Clay Cook (born 1978), American songwriter, producer and musician

D 
Daequan Cook (born 1987), American player with Israeli Basketball Premier League
Dale Cook (born 1958), American kickboxer
Dalvin Cook (born 1995), American football player
Daniel Cook (disambiguation), multiple people
Damien Cook (born 1991), Australian Rugby League player
Dane Cook (born 1972), American comedian
David Cook (disambiguation), multiple people
Dean Cook (born 1985), British actor
Dennis Cook (born 1962), American professional baseball pitcher
Dianne Cook (basketball) (born 1951), Australian basketball player
Dick Cook, American Chairman of Disney Studios
Doc Cook (Charles L. Cooke, 1891–1958), American jazz bandleader
Don Cook (born 1949), American record producer and songwriter, mainly in the field of country music
Don Cook (organist), organ area coordinator and the university carillonneur at Brigham Young University
Donna Cook (1926–2006), All-American Girls Professional Baseball League player
Doris Cook (born 1931), All-American Girls Professional Baseball League player
Dorothy Cook, All-American Girls Professional Baseball League player

E 
Edith Agnes Cook (1859–1942), first female student at Adelaide University, principal of the Advanced School for Girls
Eli Cook (1814–1865), American politician
Eli Cook (musician) (born 1986), American singer, songwriter, guitarist and record producer
Elisha Cook Jr. (1903–1995), American actor
Elizabeth Cook (disambiguation), multiple people
Everett Richard Cook (1894–1974), American World War I flying ace

F 
Fielder Cook (1923–2003), American television and film director, producer and writer
Francis Cook (disambiguation), multiple people
Frank Cook (disambiguation), multiple people
Fred Cook (disambiguation), multiple people
Frederick Cook (disambiguation), multiple people

G 
Garry Cook (born 1958), British athlete
Garry Cook (CEO), British football executive, currently with Manchester City
George Cook (disambiguation), multiple people
Geoff Cook (born Geoffrey Cook in 1951), England cricketer
Glen Cook (born 1944), author
Glen Cook (baseball), American baseball player
Greg Cook (disambiguation), multiple people

H 
Harry Cook (disambiguation), multiple people
Henry Cook (disambiguation), multiple people
 Herman Cook, known as Junior Cook (1934–1992), hard bop tenor saxophone player
Hugh Cook (Canadian novelist) (born 1942), Canadian writer
Hugh Cook (science fiction author) (1956–2008), English-born novelist
Hume Cook, James Hume Cook, Australian politician

I 
Ian Cook (disambiguation), multiple people
Ira Cook (1821–1902), American surveyor, mayor, banker, tax collector, city council member, investor and entrepreneur

J 
James Cook (disambiguation), multiple people
Jamie Cook, guitarist with British the Arctic Monkeys
Jamie Cook (footballer), English footballer
Jane Constance Cook (Ga’axstal’as) (1870–1951), Canadian first nations leader and activist 
Jesse Cook, Canadian guitarist
Jeffrey Cook (disambiguation), multiple people
Jill Cook, British curator
Jim Cook (racing driver), NASCAR driver
Jim Cook Jr., US Army soldier
Jimmy Cook, South African cricketer
Joan Cook (born 1934), Canadian Senator for Newfoundland and Labrador
Joan Riddell Cook, founding director of JAWS (Journalism and Women Symposium)
Joel Cook (1842–1910), American politician from Pennsylvania
John Cook (disambiguation), multiple people
Johnny Cook (Canadian football), American football player
Jonathan Cook (born 1965), British writer and journalist based in Israel
Jordan Cook (born 1990), English footballer
Joseph Cook (disambiguation), multiple people
Julian Cook (1916–2017), US Army officer
Julian Abele Cook Jr. (1930–2017), US District Court judge
Junior Cook (1934–1992), Herman Cook, American hard bop tenor saxophone player
Justin Cook (born 1982), American voice actor

K 
Kathy Smallwood-Cook (born 1960), British sprint athlete
Kenneth Cook (1929–1987), Australian journalist and novelist
Kristy Lee Cook (born 1984), American singer

L 
Lawrence Cook (disambiguation), multiple people
Lee Cook (born 1982), English footballer
Lemuel Cook (1759–1866), American Revolutionary War veteran
Leonard Cook (1912–?), Australian boxer at the 1936 Olympics
Lester Cook (born 1984), American tennis player
Lewis H. Cook, American politician
Louise Cook (born 1987), British rally driver

M 
Mariana Cook (born 1955), American photographer
Marlow Cook (1926–2016), Republican US Senator from Kentucky
Marv Cook (born 1966), American football player
Matthew Cook (disambiguation), multiple people
Merrill Cook (born 1946), Republican member of the US House of Representatives from Utah
Michael Cook (disambiguation), multiple people
Mindy Cook (born 1988), American goalball player
Mitch Cook (born 1961), English football player
Moxon Cook (1857–1917), Australian sports journalist
Murray Cook (born 1960), Australian musician
Myke Cook (born 1989), Australian football player

N 
Natalie Cook (born 1975), Australian beach volleyball player
Nathaniel Cook (19th century), designer of the standard set of chess figures 
Nicholas Cook (born 1950), British musicologist
Nick Cook (disambiguation), multiple people
Nicky Cook, English boxer
Norm Cook, American basketball player
Norman Cook (born 1963), British musician (aka Fatboy Slim)

O 
Octavia Cook (born 1978), New Zealand jeweller
Olive Cook (1912–2002), British writer and artist
Oliver Cook (born 1990), British rower
Omar Cook (born 1982), American-born, naturalized Montenegrin professional basketball player
Omar Cook (American football) (born 1992), American football defensive back
Orator F. Cook (1867–1949), American botanist, entomologist, and agronomist
Orchard Cook (1763–1819), U.S. Representative from Massachusetts
Orval R. Cook (1898–1980), United States Air Force four-star general
Oscar Cook (1888–1952), British author of novels, non-fiction works and short stories with a supernatural theme
Óscar Alvarado Cook (born 1944), Mexican politician from the Institutional Revolutionary Party
Otis Cook (1900–1980), American painter born in New Bedford, Massachusetts

P 
Pam Cook (born 1943), English film theorist
Pamela Cook, American mathematician
Paul Cook (disambiguation) multiple people
Paula Cook (born 1969), British auto racing driver
Penny Cook (1957–2018), Australian actress
Perry R. Cook (born 1955), American computer music researcher and professor at Princeton
Peter Cook (disambiguation), multiple people

Q 
Quentin L. Cook (born 1940), American lawyer, business executive, and religious leader in the LDS Church
Quinn Cook (born 1993), American basketball player

R 
R. James Cook (born 1937), American phytopathologist
Rachael Leigh Cook (born 1979), American actress and model
Ralph Cook (born 1944), Associate Justice of the Alabama Supreme Court
Randall William Cook (born 1951), American visual effects artist
Richard Cook (disambiguation) multiple people
Rick Cook (architect) (born 1960), New York City architect
Rick Cook (writer) (1944–2022), American author
Robin Cook (disambiguation), multiple people
Roderick Cook (1932–1990), English playwright, writer, director, and actor
Rodney Mims Cook Jr. (born 1956), American businessman
Rodney Mims Cook Sr. (1924–2013), American politician and activist
Roger Cook (disambiguation), multiple people
Ron Cook (born 1948), English actor
Ryan Cook (disambiguation), multiple people

S 
Samuel Cook (disambiguation), multiple people
Scott Cook (born 1952), American entrepreneur
Sharon Anne Cook (born 1947), Canadian historian
Sherburne F. Cook (1896–1974), American physiologist and pioneer in population studies
Stephen Cook (disambiguation)
Steve Cook (disambiguation), multiple people
Stu Cook (born 1945), bassist with U.S rock band Creedence Clearwater Revival

T 
Ted Cook (American football) (1922–2006), American football player
Ted Cook (footballer) (1901–1957), New Zealand footballer
Terry Cook (disambiguation), multiple people
Theodore Andrea Cook (1867–1928), British writer and art critic
Thomas Cook (1808–1892), English businessman
T. S. Cook (1947–2013), American screenwriter and producer
Timothy D. Cook (born 1960), CEO of Apple, Inc.
Tommy Cook (actor) (born 1930), American producer, screenwriter, and actor
Troy Cook (born 1976), Australian footballer
Tyler Cook (born 1997), American basketball player

V 
Vernon Cook (1927–1987), former member of the Ohio House of Representatives
Victor Cook (born c. 1960/1961), American television director, writer, and producer
Victoria Cook (1933–2019), former World Champion archer who represented the United States
Virgil Young Cook (1848–1922), American Confederate veteran and planter
Vivian Cook (linguist) (1940–2021), Emeritus Professor of Applied Linguistics at Newcastle University, UK
Vivian E. Cook (born 1937), represents District 32 in the New York State Assembly

W 
Walter William Spencer Cook (1888–1962), American art historian and professor, specialized in Spanish Medieval art history
Wesley Cook (born 1954), later known as Mumia Abu-Jamal, American convicted of the 1981 murder of a Philadelphia police officer
Whitfield Cook (1909–2003), American writer
Will Marion Cook (1869–1944), American composer and violinist
William Cook (disambiguation), multiple people
Willie Cook (1923–2000), American jazz trumpeter
W. T. Cook (1884–1970), American college sports coach

Y 
Yassar Cook (born 1993), South African first-class cricketer
Yvette Cook, known as "Lady E", member of Newcleus, American electro and old school hip hop group

Z 
Zachary Cook (fl. 2000s–2010s), American politician, Republican member of the New Mexico House of Representatives
Zadock Cook (1769–1863), United States Representative from Georgia

See also 
Cooke
Cook (disambiguation)
Kook (surname)

References

External links 
 Cook Surname DNA Project

English-language surnames
Occupational surnames
Surnames of English origin
English-language occupational surnames